The 1st Blockbuster Entertainment Awards were held on June 3, 1995 at the Pantages Theatre in Los Angeles. The awards originally had categories for both video and theatrical releases. Below is a complete list of winners.

Film

Favorite Actress in an Action/Adventure/Thriller - Video
Sandra Bullock, Speed

Favorite Actress in an Action/Adventure/Thriller - Theatrical
Sandra Bullock, Speed

Favorite Actress in a Drama - Video
Meg Ryan, When a Man Loves a Woman

Favorite Actress in a Drama - Theatrical
Demi Moore, Disclosure

Favorite Actress in a Comedy - Video
Whoopi Goldberg, Sister Act 2

Favorite Actress in a Comedy - Theatrical
Jodie Foster, Maverick

Favorite Female Newcomer - Video
Angela Bassett, What's Love Got To Do With It

Favorite Female Newcomer - Theatrical
Cameron Diaz, The Mask

Favorite Actor in an Action/Adventure/Thriller - Video
Harrison Ford, The Fugitive

Favorite Actor in an Action/Adventure/Thriller - Theatrical
Harrison Ford, Clear and Present Danger

Favorite Actor in a Drama - Video
Tom Hanks, Philadelphia

Favorite Actor in a Drama - Theatrical
Tom Hanks, Forrest Gump

Favorite Actor in a Comedy - Video
Jim Carrey, Ace Ventura: Pet Detective

Favorite Actor in a Comedy - Theatrical
Jim Carrey, The Mask

Favorite Male Newcomer - Video
Jim Carrey, Ace Ventura: Pet Detective

Favorite Male Newcomer - Theatrical
Tim Allen, The Santa Clause

Favorite Movie - Video
Speed

Favorite Movie - Theatrical
Forrest Gump

Favorite Family Movie - Video
Rookie of the Year

Favorite Family Movie - Theatrical
The Lion King

Icon Award
Sylvester Stallone

Pioneer Award
Brian Grazer

Music

Favorite Pop Artist - Female
Mariah Carey

Favorite Pop Artist - Male
Kenny G

Favorite Classic Rock Artist - Group
The Eagles

Favorite Classic Rock Artist - Male
Eric Clapton

Favorite R&B Artist - Female
Anita Baker

Favorite R&B Artist - Male
Luther Vandross

Favorite R&B Artist - Group
Boys II Men

Favorite New Artist
Sheryl Crow

Favorite New Artist - Group
Ace of Base

Favorite Country Artist - Male
Alan Jackson

Favorite Country Artist - Female
Reba McEntire

Favorite Rap Artist - Duo or Group
Beastie Boys

Favorite Modern Rock Band
Green Day

Favorite CD
Boys II Men-II

Favorite Soundtrack
The Lion King

References

 1995 awards in the United States
 1995 film awards
 1995 music awards
 1995 in California
1995 in Los Angeles
 Blockbuster LLC